Anterior tibial may refer to:

 Anterior tibial artery
 Anterior tibial vein
 Anterior tibial recurrent artery
 Saber shin also known from anterior tibial bowing
 Tibialis anterior muscle also known as anterior tibialis